Saint Lucia elects on the national level a legislature. The Legislature has two chambers. The House of Assembly has 17 members, elected for a five-year term in single-seat constituencies. The Senate has 11 appointed members. 
Saint Lucia has a two-party system, which means that there are two dominant political parties, with extreme difficulty for anybody to achieve electoral success under the banner of any other party.

Latest election

Central Castries by-election
Independent candidate Richard Frederick won the Castries Central seat at a by-election on 13 March 2006. Frederick defeated the incumbent Sarah Flood-Beaubrun and Saint Lucia Labour Party candidate Victor La Corbiniere.

See also
 Electoral calendar
 Electoral system

External links
St Lucia Electoral Department website
Adam Carr's Election Archive